Deštné v Orlických horách is a municipality and village in Rychnov nad Kněžnou District in the Hradec Králové Region of the Czech Republic. It has about 500 inhabitants. It lies in the Orlické Mountains.

History
The first written mention of Deštné v Orlických horách is from 1362. It was founded before 1350.

Sport
Deštné v Orlických horách is known for its ski resort.

Gallery

References

External links

Deštné ski resort

Villages in Rychnov nad Kněžnou District
Ski areas and resorts in the Czech Republic